Duke of Turin was the title of a line of dukes among the Lombards when they ruled Italy in the Early Middle Ages.

Several holders went on to become king, including Agilulf, Raginpert, Arioald and Aripert II.

References

Lombards
History of Turin